Oh, Brother! is a British television sitcom originally broadcast from 1968 to 1970.

Oh, Brother! may also refer to:

 Oh, Brother! (comic strip), by Bob Weber Jr. and Jay Stephens
 "Oh, Brother!" (AoSMB3 episode), an episode of The Adventures of Super Mario Bros. 3

See also
 O Brother, Where Art Thou?, a 2000 comedy film
 "Oh Brother, Where Art Thou?", a 1991 episode in the second series of The Simpsons
 "O Brother, Where Bart Thou?", a 2009 episode in the 21st series of The Simpsons
 "Oh Brother...She's my Sister", a Barney & Friends episode
 Oh! Brothers, a band
 O'Brother, an Atlantan rock band